Bhatpar Rani is a town and tehsil in Deoria District in the state of Uttar Pradesh in India. It belongs to Gorakhpur Division. It is located 48 km towards East from District headquarters Deoria.The Member of Legislative Council of Bhatpar Rani Constituency is Shri. Sabhakunwar Kushwaha In Bhatpar Rani, the block number of village is 127. The biggest village in this tehsil is Sarayan. Khan Sir(Teacher), Shilpi Raj(Singer) were born here.

Demographics
As of the 2011 Indian census, Bhatpar Rani is a Nagar Panchayat city in district of Deoria, Uttar Pradesh. Bhatpar Rani city is divided into 12 wards in which elections are held every 5 years. Bhatpar Rani (NP) has a population of 14,839, of which 7,692 are males and 7,147 are females.

The population of children aged 0-6 is 1,962, which is 13.22% of the total population of Bhatpar Rani (NP). In Bhatpar Rani Nagar Panchayat, the female sex ratio is 929 compared to the state average of 912. Moreover, the child sex ratio is around 960, compared to the Uttar Pradesh state average of 902. The literacy rate is 80.71%, higher than the state average of 67.68%. In Bhatpar Rani, Male literacy is around 86.94% while the female literacy rate is 73.97%.

Bhatpar Rani (NP) has total administration over 2,201 houses to which it supplies basic amenities like water and sewerage. It is also authorized to build roads within the Nagar Panchayat limits and impose taxes on properties coming under its jurisdiction.

Economy 

Life in this area is dependent on agriculture and various types of business. Most of the commodities purchased are unprocessed or semi-processed agricultural products. These are cleaned, graded and packaged by farmers prior to distribution in local and international markets. 10% of the farmers' agri-commodities are processed into supermarket-ready products, including maize, wheat, soya beans, rice, sorghum, millet, beans, pigeon peas, cowpeas, chickpeas, green gram, groundnuts, cashew nuts, sesame seed, niger seed, coriander seed, cumin seed, linseed, ginger, cloves, sugar, coffee, fertiliser, and tea.

Transportation

Railway stations 
The nearest railway station to Bhatpar Rani is Bhatpar Rani railway station, which is located in and around 0.2 km distance. Other railway stations include:

Airports 
Bhatpar Rani's nearest airport is Kushinagar Airport, situated 52.7 km away. Other airports around Bhatpar Rani include:

Nearby places

Nearest Districts

Bhatpar Rani is located around 39 kilometres from its district headquarters Deoria. The other nearest district headquarters is Gopalganj situated at 43.6 km from Bhatpar Rani. Surrounding districts from Bhatpar Rani are as follows:
Gopalganj (Gopalganj) district, 43.6 km
Siwan (Siwan) district, 61.3 km
Mau (Mau) district, 62.3 km
Kushinagar (Padarauna) district, 65.9 km
Gorakhpur (Gorakhpur) district, 89.2 km

Nearest Towns and Cities

Bhatpar Rani's nearest town is Lar, located at the distance of 11.6 km. Surrounding town/city/TP/CT from Bhatpar Rani are as follows.
Lar, 11.6 km
Salempur, 12 km
Mairwa, 14.4 km
Belthara, 26.4 km
Maniyar, 39.1 km
Gopalganj, 43.4 km

Education

Government Colleges in and around Bhatpar Rani 
Bhatpar Rani's nearest colleges and schools are as follows:
Madan Mohan Malviya Degree College, 0.9 km
Baba Raghav Dash Krishak Inter College, 0.2 km
Baba Raghav Dash Girls Inter College, 0.3 km
Rajarshi Tondon Balika Vidyalaya, 0.9 km
 J.K. Public School

List of villages in the Bhatpar Rani area

Bhatpar Rani is a Tehsil/Block in the Deoria district of Uttar Pradesh. According to 2011 census information, the sub-district code of Bhatpar Rani block is 00963. There are about 343 villages in Bhatpar Rani block.

References

Cities and towns in Deoria district